Coralliophila kalafuti is a species of sea snail, a marine gastropod mollusk in the family Muricidae, the murex snails or rock snails.

Description
Original description: "Shell somewhat fusiform in shape, with inflated body whorl and flaring lip; spire elevated; body whorl and spire whorls ornamented with numerous raised spiral threads, which give shell rough appearance; aperture very wide and flaring; columella with large, flaring parietal shield; parietal shield detached from shell along edges; shoulder rounded; shell color pale lilac; interior of aperture lilac-purple; columella white."

Distribution
Locus typicus: "Off Harry Harris State Park, 
South-Eastern end of Key Largo, Florida Keys, USA."

References

Gastropods described in 1987
Coralliophila